Maxime Dufour-Lapointe (born February 9, 1989)  is a Canadian freestyle skier from Montréal, Quebec.

She competed at the 2014 Winter Olympics for Canada in moguls. Dufour-Lapointe is the oldest of three sisters to compete at the Winter Olympics with her younger sisters Chloé Dufour-Lapointe and Justine Dufour-Lapointe both being world champion medalists and Olympic medalists. This was the fifth time that three siblings have competed at the same event at the Winter Games.

Personal life
Dufour-Lapointe is currently studying medicine at the University of Montreal.

References

External links
 
 Official website
 Freestyle Skiing Canada profile
 

1989 births
Living people
Canadian female freestyle skiers
French Quebecers
Freestyle skiers at the 2014 Winter Olympics
Skiers from Montreal
Olympic freestyle skiers of Canada